The Apuan Alps are a mountain range in northern Tuscany, Italy.

The name derives from the Apuani Ligures tribe that lived there in ancient times. 

The mountain range is known for its Carrara marble. Due to its extraction height environmental impact, the No Cav movement strongly opposes this activity.

Geology and geography

The chain formed out of sea sediments in the middle Triassic period, somewhat earlier than the rest of the Apennines, and on a rather different geological structure. Over time, these sediments hardened into limestone, dolomite, sandstone, and shale. Harsh pressure approximately 25 million years ago transformed the limestone in many places into the Carrara marble (named for the nearby city of Carrara) for which the range is renowned. Erosion carved much of the remaining sedimentary rocks into a jagged karst topography.

The No Cav environmental movement is fighting for the closure of the marble quarries in the Apuan Alps due to their environmental impact.

Main peaks 
Monte Pisanino – The highest peak in the Apuan alps
Monte Tambura (1,890 m)
Monte Cavallo (1,888 m)
Pania della Croce (1,858 m)
Monte Grondìlice (1,808 m)
Monte Contrario (1,788 m)
Pizzo d'Uccello (1,781 m)
Monte Sumbra (1765 m)
Monte Sagro (1,749 m)

References

External links

 Alpi Apuane Park official website

Mountain ranges of Italy
Mountains of Tuscany